The following is a list of events affecting Philippine television in 2006. Events listed include television show debuts, finales, cancellations, and channel launches, closures and rebrandings, as well as information about controversies and carriage disputes.

Events

February
February 4 - A stampede occurred during the first anniversary of ABS-CBN's television program Wowowee at the PhilSports Complex, causing the deaths of 74 people and the wounding of about 400 others.

April
April 1 - Keanna Reeves is voted winner of the first season of Pinoy Big Brother: Celebrity Edition.

May
May 6 - Gerald Santos wins Pinoy Pop Superstar on its Grand Showdown held at the Araneta Coliseum.

June
June 3 - 16-year-old Kim Chiu is voted winner of the first season of Pinoy Big Brother: Teen Edition.

October
October 1 - Sports Plus ceased broadcasting and replaced by the Basketball TV channel formed by Solar, while moving most of Sports Plus programs to Solar Sports.
October 12 - Studio 23 (now S+A) celebrated its 10th anniversary.

November
November 26 - Miss Earth 2006 beauty pageant was hosted by the Philippines at the National Museum Grounds at Manila. Miss Chile won the pageant.

December
December 10 - Mau Marcelo wins the first season of Philippine Idol (INQ7.net)
December 16 - Yeng Constantino emerged as the Grand Star Dreamer of the first season of Pinoy Dream Academy. ABS-CBN launched their Lupang Hinirang MTV which also aired on Studio 23 until June 12, 2011.

Unknown (dates)
 G Sat was launched as a direct-to-home satellite provider by First United Broadcasting Corporation (now Global Satellite Technology Services).

Premieres

Unknown dates
March: Bongga Ka Star (QTV 11)
April: For M on RPN 9
May
 CatDog on ABC 5
 ChalkZone on ABC 5
 Hey Arnold! on ABC 5
 Global Guts on ABC 5
 The Wild Thornberrys on ABC 5
 SpongeBob SquarePants on ABC 5
 Danny Phantom on ABC 5
September:
 Milyonaryong Mini on ABS-CBN 2
 Nanny 911 on ETC 2nd Avenue
 Final Fantasy: Unlimited on GMA 7
October:
 iPBA on ABC 5 (now TV5)
 NBA Action on Basketball TV
 NBA Inside Stuff on Basketball TV
 NBA Jam on Basketball TV
 Hardwood Classics on Basketball TV
 Vintage NBA on Basketball TV
 Home Shopping Network on Basketball TV

Unknown
Kids TV on ABC 5
America Atbp. on ABC 5 
Metro on ABC 5
Generation RX on ABC 5
Star sa Kusina on ABC 5
PBA Classics on ABC 5
America's Next Top Model on ETC
Cold Case on ETC
Inside Edition on ETC 2nd Avenue
Real Pinoy Fighter on ABS-CBN 2
The Healing Eucharist on ABS-CBN 2
Salam on ABS-CBN 2
Yes To Christmas on ABS-CBN 2
IBCinema Nights on IBC 13
Primetime Sinemax on IBC 13
Believer's Voice of Victory on IBC 13
Power & Mercy on IBC 13
Power to Unite with Elvira on IBC 13
Chowtime: Conquest on IBC 13
Jesus the Healer on GMA 7
PJM Forum on GMA 7
Barangay Uniting For Chess on SBN 21
Usapang Legal with Willie on SBN 21
Morning! Umaga Na! on SBN 21
Celebrity Night of Dance and Music on SBN 21
The 700 Club Asia on QTV 11
Gag Ito! on Studio 23
Kapatid Sa Hanapbuhay on Net 25

Returning or renamed programs

Programs transferring networks

Finales
January 2: TV Patrol Dumaguete (ABS-CBN TV-12 Dumaguete)
January 6: Agos (GMA 7)
January 20:
 Amazing Twins (ABS-CBN 2)
 Poor Prince (GMA 7)
January 22: Search for the Star in a Million (ABS-CBN 2)
January 28: My Juan and Only (ABS-CBN 2)
February 1: Pusong Wagi (QTV 11)
February 10:
 Sugo (GMA 7)
 Vietnam Rose (ABS-CBN 2)
 Only You (ABS-CBN 2)
February 17:
 First Love of a Royal Prince (GMA 7)
 Etheria (GMA 7)
February 24:
 Palawan TV Patrol (ABS-CBN TV-7 Palawan)
 Mga Anghel na Walang Langit (ABS-CBN 2)
February 26: F! (Studio 23)
March 12: StarStruck (season 3) (GMA 7)
April 8: Nginiig (ABS-CBN 2)
April 9: Jologs Guide (GMA 7)
April 11: Bora: Sons of the Beach (ABS-CBN 2)
April 12:
 Tinig (GMA 7)
 Princess Lulu (ABS-CBN 2)
April 14: RPN Arangkada Balita (RPN 9)
April 21:
 Sad Love Song (GMA 7)
 Mars (QTV 11)
 Snow White, Sweet Love (GMA 7)
April 28:
 Le Robe De Mariage (GMA 7)
 Spring Day (ABS-CBN 2)
Laugh to Laugh: Ang Kulit! (QTV 11)
 Encantadia: Pag-ibig Hanggang Wakas (GMA 7)
 My Name is Kim Sam Soon (GMA 7)
April 29: Wag Kukurap (GMA 7)
May 5: Outstanding Twins (ABS-CBN 2)
May 12:
 Gulong ng Palad (ABS-CBN 2)
 Hongkong Flight 143 (GMA 7)
May 19: Little Amy (ABS-CBN 2)
May 25: American Idol (season 5) (ABC 5)
May 26: Ang Panday (ABS-CBN 2)
June 13:
 Jewel in the Palace (GMA 7)
 My Guardian Abby (QTV 11)
June 16: Wonderful Life (ABS-CBN 2)
June 17: Candies (QTV 11)
June 19: Liga ng Kababaihan (QTV 11)
June 23:
 Gokusen (GMA 7)
 Show Ko! (QTV 11)
June 25: ASAP Fanatic (ABS-CBN 2)
June 28: Pinoy Abroad (GMA 7)
June 30:
 ABS-CBN Insider (ABS-CBN 2)
 Noel (QTV 11)
July 12: Good Luck! (GMA 7)
July 21: Duyan (GMA 7)
July 22:
 Quizon Avenue (ABS-CBN 2)
 Wow Maling Mali (ABC 5)
July 28: House Husband (GMA 7)
August 5: Isumbong Mo Kay Tulfo (RPN 9)
August 6: Wedding (ABS-CBN 2)
August 11:
 Agawin Mo Man ang Lahat (GMA 7)
 Love of the Condor Heroes (GMA 7)
August 20:
 U Can Dance (ABS-CBN 2)
 Sunday Family Cinema (ABS-CBN 2)
August 21: OK Fine, 'To Ang Gusto Nyo! (ABS-CBN 2)
August 24: My Girl (ABS-CBN 2)
August 25:
 Sa Piling Mo (ABS-CBN 2)
 Gudtaym (ABS-CBN 2)
September 1: Ang Pagbabago (GMA 7)
September 7: A Second Proposal (GMA 7)
September 8: Calla Lily (ABS-CBN 2
September 14: A Love to Kill (ABS-CBN 2)
September 15: I Luv NY (GMA 7)
September 22: Linlang (GMA 7)
September 29: Majika (GMA 7)
September 30: Project 11 (QTV 11)
October 1: Big News Ngayon (ABC 5)
October 6:
 Bituing Walang Ningning (ABS-CBN 2)
 Chowtime Na! Laban Na! (IBC 13)
October 13:
 TV Patrol Dagupan (ABS-CBN TV-32 Dagupan)
 Love Story In Harvard (GMA 7)
October 19: Miss Kim's Million Dollar Quest (GMA 7)
October 22:
 Love to Love (GMA 7)
 SOP Gigsters (GMA 7)
October 27: Pasión de Amor (ABS-CBN 2)
November 2: Debate with Mare at Pare (GMA 7)
November 3:
 MariMar (ABS-CBN 2)
 Pinakamamahal (GMA 7)
November 24:
 Dangal (GMA 7)
 Into The Sun (GMA 7)
December 3: Hoooo U? (GMA 7)
December 9: Fantastikids (GMA 7)
December 10: Philippine Idol (ABC 5)
December 16: Pinoy Dream Academy (season 1) (ABS-CBN 2)
December 23: Posh (QTV 11)
December 29: Crazy for You (ABS-CBN 2)

Unknown dates
October: NBA Jam (Solar Sports)
November: Na-Scam Ka Na Ba? (QTV 11)

Unknown
Entertainment Konek (ABS-CBN 2)
Yes, Yes Show! (ABS-CBN 2)
Kontrobersyal (ABS-CBN 2)
Pipol (ABS-CBN 2)
PBB: What's The Word That's The Word (ABS-CBN 2)
Close Up to Fame, The Search for the Next Close Up Couple (ABS-CBN 2)
Payong Kapatid (ABS-CBN 2)
Chowtime Na, Laban Na! (IBC 13)
SMS: Sunday Mall Show (IBC 13)
Mobile Kusina (GMA 7)
Txtube (GMA 7)
Pops Talk Show (ABC 5)
Look Who's Talking (ABC 5)
Wala Yan Sa Lolo Ko! (ABC 5)
How 'Bout My Place (ABC 5)
Kapatid (RPN 9)
Lil' Elvis and the Truckstoppers (Net 25)
The Planet (Net 25)
Ginintuang Telon (QTV 11)
Eternal Love (ABS-CBN 2)
Dos Amores (ABS-CBN 2)
TV Patrol Iligan (ABS-CBN TV-4 Iligan)

Networks

Launches
 January 8: Sonshine TV 39 Manila
 March 16: HBO Hits
 October 1: Basketball TV
 November 26: UniversiTV
 Unknown: Golf Channel

Closures
 September 30: Sports Plus
 December 31: MTV Philippines

Births
 January 19: JB Agustin, actor, socialite and philanthropist
 February 26: Dayara Shane, actress 
 April 10: Sofia Pablo, actress
 April 11: Jana Indanan, actress and dancer
 May 3: Mutya Orquia, actress
 June 23: CX Navarro, actor
 September 14: Hannah Lopez Vito, actress and host of Team Yey!

Deaths
 January 23: Ernie Baron, television journalist, host, and inventor (born 1940)
 April 23: Chat Silayan, actress and former beauty queen (born 1960)
 August 14: Analiza "Hazel" Recheta, Arnel Guiao and Ismael Cabugayan, television journalists
 September 18: Eddie Mercado, television host (born 1938)
 September 20: Jojo Lapus, newspaper journalist and television scriptwriter (born 1945)
 October 7: Dan Campilan, television journalist (born 1980)
 November 24: Maximo V. Soliven, newspaper journalist and publisher (born 1933)
 November 28: Rosita Quinto Stecza, 1950s actress under the screen name Rosa Mia (born 1924)
 December 22: Danilo Ayala Bernardo, journalist (born 1948)

References

See also
2006 in television

 
Television in the Philippines by year
Philippine television-related lists